The 2015 Nigerian Senate election in Ekiti State was held on March 28, 2015, to elect members of the Nigerian Senate to represent Ekiti State. Fatimat Olufunke Raji-Rasaki representing Ekiti Central, Duro Faseyi representing Ekiti North and Abiodun Olujimi representing Ekiti South all won on the platform of Peoples Democratic Party.

Overview

Summary

Results

Ekiti Central 
Peoples Democratic Party candidate Fatimat Olufunke Raji-Rasaki won the election, defeating All Progressives Congress candidate Gbenga Olofin and other party candidates.

Ekiti North 
Peoples Democratic Party candidate Duro Faseyi won the election, defeating All Progressives Congress candidate Olubunmi Adetunbi and other party candidates.

Ekiti South 
Peoples Democratic Party candidate Abiodun Olujimi won the election, defeating All Progressives Congress candidate Anthony Adeniyi and other party candidates.

References 

Ekiti State Senate elections
March 2015 events in Nigeria
Eki